Kaledibi can refer to:

 Kaledibi, Düzce
 Kaledibi, Hani
 Kaledibi, Olur